Sebastian Samuelsson  (born 28 March 1997) is a Swedish biathlete who competes internationally.

He participated in the 2018 Winter Olympics. There he won a silver medal in the 12.5 km pursuit event as well as the gold medal in the relay. He became a World champion at 2023 Oberhof when he won gold medal in 15 km Mass start race. 

Samuelsson has been outspoken on his views on the presence of doping in the sport, and has especially been critical of Russia and its anti-doping agency RUSADA.

Summer biathlon
In August 2019, he became Swedish champion at the 10 kilometres sprint distance and the 20 kilometres distance during the Swedish national summer biathlon championships in Sollefteå.

Biathlon results
All results are sourced from the International Biathlon Union.

Olympic Games
2 medals (1 gold, 1 silver)

World Championships
9 medals (1 gold, 2 silver, 6 bronze)

*During Olympic seasons competitions are only held for those events not included in the Olympic program.
**The single mixed relay was added as an event in 2019.

World Cup

Overall standings

Individual podiums
 3 victories – (2 Sp, 1 Pu) 
 13 podiums

Team podiums
6 victories 
13 podiums

References

External links

1997 births
Living people
Swedish male biathletes
Olympic biathletes of Sweden
Biathletes at the 2018 Winter Olympics
Biathletes at the 2022 Winter Olympics
People from Katrineholm Municipality
Medalists at the 2018 Winter Olympics
Olympic medalists in biathlon
Olympic gold medalists for Sweden
Olympic silver medalists for Sweden
Biathlon World Championships medalists
Sportspeople from Södermanland County
21st-century Swedish people